Surk Rural District is in Bafruiyeh District of Meybod County, Yazd province, Iran. At the most recent National Census of 2016, the population of the rural district was 702 in 240 households. The largest of its 50 villages was Hafthar, with 256 people.

References 

Meybod County

Rural Districts of Yazd Province

Populated places in Yazd Province

Populated places in Meybod County

fa:دهستان درین